Justice Chase may refer to:

United States Supreme Court
 Samuel Chase, associate justice of the United States Supreme Court
 Salmon P. Chase, chief justice of the United States Supreme Court

U.S. state supreme courts
 Dudley Chase, chief justice of the Vermont Supreme Court
 Emory A. Chase, justice of the New York Supreme Court and a judge of the New York Court of Appeals
 Harrie B. Chase, associate justice of the Vermont Supreme Court
 Jeremiah Chase, associate justice of the Court of Appeals of Maryland
 Paul A. Chase, associate justice of the Vermont Supreme Court